Fethard GAA is a Gaelic Athletic Association gaelic football club located in the medieval town of Fethard, County Tipperary in Ireland. The club is affiliated to the South Division of Tipperary GAA. They have been Tipperary Senior Football champions on a record twenty one occasions.

History
The Tipperary county footballers that were attacked at Croke Park on Bloody Sunday of 1920 wore the Grangemockler colours. At that time the county wore the colours of its county champions, not having an official jersey. Fethard were the then county champions but, instead of Fethard's blue and white, Grangemockler's white and green was worn instead. The county footballers wore a white and green commemorative jersey for the 2020 Munster Senior Football Championship final - a replica of the jersey colours worn in 1920.

The club grounds is "Fethard GAA Park", or the Barracks field as it's known as locally, Due to the fact it was once part of the army drill grounds. In 1931 upon arrival in Fethard Br Leo Slattery, the thorny process of acquiring the field began. However it took another Brother, Br Albert Small to sort all the legal matters. On Sunday ninth July 1974, the field and grounds were officially opened by Fr Cunningham, local curate.  On 11 May 1982, following improvements to the grounds, it was officially opened as Fethard GAA Park. The medieval Town Wall circumnavigating Fethard runs along the southern boundary of the grounds. The facilities present include a full sized field, a patrons stand, two tennis courts, two covered handball courts, dressing rooms and an Astro turf facility completed in 2017.

Honours
 Tipperary Senior Football Champions (21) 1887, 1917, 1918, 1919, 1920, 1922, 1923, 1924, 1927, 1928, 1938, 1942, 1954, 1957, 1978, 1984, 1988, 1991, 1993, 1997, 2001
 Tipperary Minor A Football Championship Winners (4) 1957, 1985, 1989, 1999
 South Tipperary Senior Football Championship Winners (27) 1914, 1917, 1918, 1922, 1923, 1924, 1925, 1927, 1928, 1938, 1942, 1943, 1950, 1954, 1955, 1957, 1969, 1976, 1978, 1979, 1980, 1984, 1985, 1988, 1992, 1997, 2002, 2005
 South Tipperary Senior Hurling Championship (3) 1919, 1937, 1938
 South Tipperary Minor A Football Championship Winners (10) 1932, 1933, 1951, 1952, 1957, 1972, 1985, 1988, 1989, 1999
 Tipperary Intermediate Football Championship (1) 2016
 South Tipperary Intermediate Football Championship (1) 2016
 Tipperary Junior Football Championship Winners (2) 1926 (with Annervale Rovers), 1999
 South Tipperary Junior Football Championship Winners (10) 1913, 1919, 1923, 1926 (with Annervale Rovers), 1929, 1984, 1990, 1999, 2003, 2008
 Tipperary Junior B Football Championship Winners (2) 1998, 2012
 South Tipperary Junior B Football Championship Winners (2) 1998, 2012
 South Tipperary Junior Hurling Championship Winners (1) 1978
 Tipperary Under-21 Football Championship Winners (2 (8) 1966, 1967, 1968, 1987, 1988, 2000, 2001, 2002
 South Tipperary Under-21 Football Championship (10) 1966, 1967, 1978, 1987, 1988, 1993, 1999, 2000, 2001, 2002
 South Tipperary Under-21 B Football Championship (1) 2007
 South Tipperary Under-21 B Hurling Championship (4) 1990, 1993, 1997, 2001
 South Tipperary Minor B Football Championship (1) 2007
 South Tipperary Minor Hurling Championship (2) 1932, 1941
 South Tipperary Minor B Hurling Championship (3) 1987, 1996, 2007

Notable players
 Glen Burke

References

Gaelic games clubs in County Tipperary
Gaelic football clubs in County Tipperary